

This is a list of the Sites of Special Scientific Interest (SSSIs) in the county of Dorset, England, United Kingdom. In England the body responsible for designating SSSIs is Natural England, which chooses a site because of its fauna, flora, geological or physiographical features. Natural England uses Dorset's borders to mark one of its Areas of Search. , there are 139 sites designated in this Area of Search. There are 20 sites with a purely geological interest, and 103 listed for biological interest. A further 16 sites are designated for both reasons.

Natural England took over the role of designating and managing SSSIs from English Nature in October 2006 when it was formed from the amalgamation of English Nature, parts of the Countryside Agency and the Rural Development Service. Natural England, like its predecessor, uses the 1974–1996 county system and as such the same approach is followed here. The data in the table is taken from Natural England in the form of citation sheets for each SSSI, and the County Background Datasheet for Dorset.

For other counties, see List of SSSIs by Area of Search.

Sites

Notes

Data rounded to one decimal place.
Grid reference is based on the British national grid reference system, also known as OSGB36, and is the system used by the Ordnance Survey.
Link to maps using the Nature on the Map service provided by English Nature.

References

Sites of Special Scientific Interest in Dorset
Dorset
Sites of Special Scientific Interest